Atuna indica is a species of plant in the family Chrysobalanaceae. It is endemic to India.

References

indica
Endemic flora of India (region)
Endangered plants
Taxonomy articles created by Polbot